Nasaasaaq ([nasaːsɑːq̚] ) is a  prominent mountain in the Qeqqata municipality in western Greenland. It is located on the mainland of Greenland, immediately to the southeast of Sisimiut on the northern coast of Amerloq Fjord, a tributary of Davis Strait.

The range flattens considerably towards the east in the area of Kangaamiut dike swarm north of Kangerlussuaq, due to pressure exerted by the icesheet for long periods in the past.

Topography 

The Nasaasaaq ridge has several summits. The ridge terminates in a  trabant overlooking Sisimiut.

The southern wall of Nasaasaaq falls directly to Amerloq Fjord.

The northern wall is not a uniform surface, dissected by ledges, dihedrals, and ramps. The main access route to the summit leads through one of the ramps to the saddle between the main summit and its western trabant. The passage on the top cone is secured by ropes for unprepared tourists.

Tourism 
The main summit is visited for its long-range view of the coast, although more limited to the north than that of Palasip Qaqqaa to the north of the town airport. An alternative route to the top of interest to mountaineers leads through the hard-to-find low pass to the east of the main summit, and from there directly on the summit cone ridge.

Polar Route 
The tough,  Arctic Circle Race takes place each winter, with the trail partially overlapping with the Polar Route from Sisimiut to Kangerlussuaq. The race was inaugurated in 1998, since then becoming an international competition. The Polar Route passes through the saddle between Nasaasaaq and the much lower Alanngorsuaq mountain to the north, with the summit of the latter sometimes visited by way of a variant. A small lift for downhill skiing is also installed on the saddle.

References 

Davis Strait
Mountains of Greenland
Sisimiut